Fame Story was a Greek reality TV show that was a licensed version of Endemol's Star Academy on the ANT1 network. It has been one of the most successful Greek TV shows of recent years. The contestants gave a weekly performance in a 2½–3 hour episode in which the contestants were judged and where one contestant was voted off after a week-long televote. On the other 6 days of the week, the best footage of the day was compiled in a late night episode from inside the academy's studios and from the adjacent house where the contestants lived for their entire stay on the show inclusively. The show's seasons ran for 3½ months, except for season three which ran for 6½ months. It is credited for having helped foster the careers of some of the show's contestants, which have gone on to produce chart topping hits in the Greek market.

The show is one of few Star Academy franchises, along with the UK's Fame Academy, to feature the iconic song "Fame" originally performed by Irene Cara in the 1980 film of the same name. However ANT1 later commissioned popular songwriter Phoebus to write the original song titled "You can be a star", and the famous Cara song was used in TV spots and montages instead.

ANT1 premiered The X Factor in its Fall 2008 lineup, thus switching to competitor FremantleMedia's The X Factor franchise.

Ιn March 17, 2017 premiered the fifth season with the title Star Academy of Greece on E Channel The Judges were Anna Vissi, Nikos Mouratides, Petros Kostopoulos and Natalia Germanou with the host Menios Fourthiotis. This was the least commercially successful season, it was a critical failure received negative reviews of the presentation and the jury and had a small number of audience reached 1%.

Series overview 

The first, second and third place contestants of Season 3 all received record deals and cash prizes because the show lasted for a staggering 6½ months (all other seasons lasted 3½ months)

Cast

Hosts

Color key: 
 – Hosts
 – Hosts (Replacement)

Judges

Color key: 
 – Judges
 – Judges (Replacement)

Contestants

Series 1

 Since Live Concert 7
 Since Live Concert 8

Series 2

 Since Live Concert 6
 Since Live Concert 7

Series 3

 

 Since Live Concert 6
 Since Live Concert 13
 Since Live Concert 17

Series 4

References 

ANT1 original programming
2002 Greek television series debuts
2006 Greek television series endings
Greek reality television series
Star Academy